A demitasse spoon is a diminutive spoon, smaller than a teaspoon. It is traditionally used for coffee drinks in specialty cups, such as a demitasse, and for spooning cappuccino froth. It is also used as a baby spoon, and in some surgical procedures.

References

Spoons
Coffee culture